The Dead is a 1987 drama film directed by John Huston, written by his son Tony Huston, and starring his daughter Anjelica Huston. It is an adaptation of the short story of the same name by James Joyce, which was first published in 1914 as the last story in Dubliners. An international co-production between the United Kingdom, the United States, and West Germany, the film was Huston's last as director, and it was released several months after his death.

The film takes place in Dublin in 1904 at an Epiphany party hosted by two sisters and their niece. The story focuses on the academic Gabriel Conroy (Donal McCann) and his discovery of his wife Gretta's (Anjelica Huston) memories of a deceased lover. The ensemble cast also includes Helena Carroll, Cathleen Delany, Dan O'Herlihy, Marie Kean, Donal Donnelly, Seán McClory, Frank Patterson, and Colm Meaney.

At the 60th Academy Awards, Tony Huston was nominated for the award for Best Adapted Screenplay and Dorothy Jeakins was nominated for Best Costume Design for their work on the film. John Huston posthumously won the award for Best Director at the 3rd Independent Spirit Awards, and Anjelica Huston won the award for Best Supporting Female at the same ceremony.

Plot
On January 6, 1904, spinster sisters Kate and Julia Morkan and their unmarried niece, Mary Jane, host their annual Epiphany dinner party at their townhouse in Dublin. Horse-drawn carriages arrive with guests on the snowy night. Three of Mary Jane's music students, Miss O'Callaghan, Miss Furlong, and Miss Higgins, enter, accompanied by the young bachelors Joseph Kerrigan and Raymond Bergin, who Miss Furlong formally introduces to Kate and her frail older sister, Julia.

Dan Brown, the only Protestant invited to the party, arrives next, followed by Kate's favorite nephew, Gabriel Conroy, and his wife Gretta. Kate is worried that Freddy Malins will show up drunk, and when he does, Gabriel promptly escorts the man to the restroom to sober him up. After a few more drinks with Mr. Brown, Freddy goes to talk to his mother, who lives in Scotland with her daughter, and Mrs. Malins berates him for failing to meet her for tea earlier.

The guests dance, Mary Jane performs a virtuosic piece on the piano, and a guest named Mr. Grace recites a poem he calls "Broken Vows", which is a lament of lost love, during which Gretta's eyes grow misty. When the dancing restarts, Kate pairs Gabriel with Molly Ivors, an Irish nationalist colleague of his. She chides Gabriel for writing for an English newspaper and not learning Irish, and in response, he declares he is sick of Ireland.

While Gretta is attempting to persuade Gabriel that they should go on a summer trip to the Aran Islands that Molly mentioned, Kate announces that Julia is going to sing "Arrayed for the Bridal", an operatic piece from her "concert days". Despite her warbling voice, Freddy drunkenly gushes over the performance, and Kate complains about the Pope ending her sister's singing career in the church choir when he replaced the women with boys.

When it is time to eat, Molly leaves the party to attend a union meeting. During the sumptuous feast, conversation topics range from opera to morality. Freddy reliably utters the wrong things, but despite his nerves, Gabriel gives a rousing speech praising the wonderful Irish hospitality shown by Kate, Julia and Mary Jane.

As the guests are leaving, Mrs. Malins asks Gabriel to look after Freddy when she returns to Scotland, and Gabriel awakens Mr. Brown and puts him in a carriage with the Malins. When almost everyone is gone, Bartell D’Arcy, a "celebrated tenor" who had not sung anything all evening, sings "The Lass of Aughrim" to Miss O'Callaghan, and Gabriel watches Gretta as she listens transfixed from the stairs. Her pensiveness continues in the carriage on the way to the hotel where she and Gabriel are staying the night, and she dismisses Gabriel's attempts to cheer her.

In their hotel room, Gabriel asks Gretta what she is thinking, and she explains that when she was young and lived with her grandmother in Galway, a boy she knew named Michael Furey used to sing "The Lass of Aughrim". She says she feels responsible for his death at age seventeen as, on the night before she returned to the convent in Dublin where she went to school, Michael left his sick bed and stood outside her window in the cold and rain to say goodbye, and he died a week later. Gretta cries herself to sleep, and Gabriel thinks that he has never felt love like the love Michael must have felt for Gretta and that it is better to die young and passionate than to wither and fade away like Julia, and presumably he will. Looking out the window, he imagines the snow falling all over Ireland, "upon all the living and the dead."

Cast

 Anjelica Huston as Gretta Conroy
 Donal McCann as Gabriel Conroy
 Helena Carroll as Aunt Kate Morkan
 Cathleen Delany as Aunt Julia Morkan
 Rachael Dowling as Lily, the maid
 Ingrid Craigie as Mary Jane, the niece
 Dan O'Herlihy as Dan Browne
 Marie Kean as Mrs Malins
 Donal Donnelly as Theodore Alfred "Freddy" Malins
 Seán McClory as Mr. Grace
 Frank Patterson as Bartell D'Arcy
 Katherine O'Toole as Miss Furlong
 Bairbre Dowling as Miss Higgins
 Maria Hayden as Miss O'Callaghan
 Cormac O'Herlihy as Joseph Kerrigan
 Colm Meaney as Raymond Bergin
 Maria McDermottroe as Molly Ivors
 Lyda Anderson as Miss Daly
 Dara Clarke as Young Lady
 Paul Grant as 1st Young Gentleman
 Paul Carroll as 2nd Young Gentleman
 Patrick Gallagher as 3rd Young Gentleman
 Brendan Dillon as Cabman
 Redmond Gleeson as Nightporter

Adaptation
Tony Huston's screenplay was a fairly close adaptation of the original story, with some alterations made to the dialogue to aid the narrative for cinema audiences. The most significant change to the story was the inclusion of a new character, Mr. Grace, who, in the film, recites an English translation of the eighth-century Middle Irish poem "Donal Óg".

Production
Weiland Schulz-Keil and Chris Sievernich, the producers of the film, had previously raised the money for Huston's 1984 film Under the Volcano. Screen rights to "The Dead" were purchased from the Joyce estate for $60,000.

Filming began on 19 January 1987. According to Pauline Kael, "Huston directed the movie, at eighty, from a wheelchair, jumping up to look through the camera, with oxygen tubes trailing from his nose to a portable generator; most of the time, he had to watch the actors on a video monitor outside the set and use a microphone to speak to the crew. Yet he went into dramatic areas that he'd never gone into before - funny, warm family scenes that might be thought completely out of his range. Huston never before blended his actors so intuitively, so musically."

Anjelica Huston said her father remained a filmmaking virtuoso despite his ill health: "He was so sick, but he could literally do it with his eyes closed. He knew when we were going to get a take way long before the camera rolled. I mean the timing was so precise that he could tell everything, exactly how it was going to go." The pressures of filming and watching her father's health deteriorate had an adverse effect on her own health, and she developed Epstein-Barr syndrome during production.

Release
The Dead was released on DVD by Lionsgate on November 3, 2009, but the initial pressing was missing nearly ten minutes of footage from early in the film. After word of this was posted on various websites, Lionsgate eventually corrected the mistake and released the full-length version.

Reception 
The Japanese filmmaker Akira Kurosawa cited The Dead as one of his 100 favorite films.

Awards
Winner
 1987: Tokyo International Film Festival Special Achievement Award – John Huston
 1988: National Society of Film Critics Award for Best Film
 1988: Independent Spirit Award for Best Director – John Huston
 1988: Independent Spirit Award for Best Supporting Female – Anjelica Huston
 1989: Bodil Award for Best Non-European Film (awarded by the Danish Film Critics Association)
 1989: Fotogramas de Plata for Best Foreign Film (awarded by the Spanish film magazine Fotogramas)
 1989: London Critics Circle Film Award for Director of the Year – John Huston

Nominated
1988: Academy Award for Best Writing, Screenplay Based on Material from Another Medium – Tony Huston
1988: Academy Award for Best Costume Design – Dorothy Jeakins
1988: Independent Spirit Award for Best Screenplay – Tony Huston
1988: Independent Spirit Award for Best Cinematography – Fred Murphy

References

External links

 
 New York Times review	

1987 films
1987 drama films
American drama films
British drama films
West German films
English-language German films
1980s English-language films
Films based on short fiction
Films relating to James Joyce
Films set in 1904
Films set in Dublin (city)
Films directed by John Huston
Films scored by Alex North
Vestron Pictures films
National Society of Film Critics Award for Best Film winners
1980s American films
1980s British films